The year 1888 in art involved some significant events.

Events
 January 26 – Paul Gauguin leaves Paris to rejoin the Pont-Aven School of artists in Brittany, where he will remain until October and meet with Émile Bernard
 February – Fifth annual exhibition of Les XX, at the Royal Museums of Fine Arts of Belgium in Brussels. Artists invited to show in addition to members of the group include Henri-Edmond Cross, Albert Dubois-Pillet, Odilon Redon, Paul Signac, Henri de Toulouse-Lautrec and James McNeill Whistler
 February 21 – Vincent van Gogh moves to Arles where he will be very productive as a painter
 March – Van Gogh begins his Langlois Bridge at Arles series
 March 22 – Fourth exhibition by the Société des Artistes Indépendants opens in Paris; it includes three paintings by van Gogh
 June – Van Gogh visits Saintes-Maries-de-la-Mer
 July 14
 The Monument à Léon Gambetta, by Jean-Paul Aubé, is inaugurated at the Louvre
 Critic Emile Hennequin drowns at Samois-sur-Seine before his protégé Odilon Redon
 August – Van Gogh begins his Décoration for the Yellow House at Arles including the Arles Sunflowers series of paintings
 August 11 – James McNeill Whistler marries fellow-artist Beatrice ("Trixie") Godwin (née Beatrix Birnie Philip), widow of architect E. W. Godwin, and they spend a working honeymoon in France
 October 3 – Leeds City Art Gallery in England opens
 October 23 – Paul Gauguin joins van Gogh in Arles, bringing Émile Bernard's painting Le Pardon de Pont-Aven
 December 23 – Having quarrelled with Gauguin, van Gogh cuts off the lower part of his own left ear, taking it to a brothel, and is removed to the local hospital
 Paul Ranson, Paul Sérusier and Maurice Denis become fellow students at the Académie Julian and form Les Nabis
 The weekly illustrated newspaper The Graphic commissions and exhibits in London 21 paintings of Shakespeare's heroines
 William De Morgan moves his London art pottery from Merton Abbey to Fulham
 Publication in English of Irish-born writer George Moore's autobiographical novel Confessions of a Young Man (London) describing bohemian life in 1870s Paris among the Impressionist painters

Exhibitions
 International Exhibition of Science, Art and Industry, in Glasgow, Scotland

Works

 Sir Lawrence Alma-Tadema – The Roses of Heliogabalus
 Reinhold Begas – Centaur and Nymph (bronze)
 Émile Bernard
 Le Pardon de Pont-Aven ("Breton Women in the Meadow")
 Brothel Scene, for Vincent (watercolor)
 Self-portrait with portrait of Paul Gauguin
 The Yellow Tree
 Joseph Boehm
 Equestrian statue of the Duke of Wellington (Hyde Park Corner, London)
 Queen Victoria Statue (College Green, Bristol)
 William-Adolphe Bouguereau – The First Mourning
 Edward Burne-Jones – The Nativity
 Gustave Caillebotte
 The Plain of Gennevilliers
 Sailing boats at Argenteuil
 Charles Calverley - Statue of Robert Burns (Albany, New York)
Émile Friant - La Toussaint
 Philip Hermogenes Calderon – Juliet
 William Merritt Chase
 The Blue Kimono
 Modern Magdalen
 Portrait of a Lady in Pink
 Charles Conder – A holiday at Mentone
 David Edward Cronin – Fugitive Slaves in the Dismal Swamp, Virginia
 Édouard Detaille – Le Rêve
Alexander Doyle – William Jasper Monument
 James Ensor – The Entry of Christ into Brussels in 1889 (J. Paul Getty Museum, Malibu)
 Akseli Gallen-Kallela – Démasquée
 Paul Gauguin
 The Painter of Sunflowers (December)
 Self-Portrait with Portrait of Émile Bernard (Les misérables)
 Vision After the Sermon
 Alfred Gilbert – Statue of Queen Victoria (Winchester)
 Antonio Gisbert Pérez - Execution of Torrijos and his Companions on the Beach at Málaga
 Peder Severin Krøyer – Hip, Hip, Hurrah!
 Frederic Leighton – Captive Andromache (approximate date)
 William Logsdail – St Martin-in-the-Fields
 Cesare Maccari – Cicero Denounces Catiline (fresco in Palazzo Madama, Rome)
 Albert Joseph Moore – A River Side
 Philip Richard Morris – Audrey
 Giovanni Muzzioli – The Funeral of Britannicus
 Ilya Repin
 Saint Nicholas of Myra saves three innocents from death
 They Did Not Expect Him
 Paul Sérusier – Le Talisman
 Georges Seurat – completion of Models (Les Poseuses) (Barnes Foundation, Philadelphia)
 Henri de Toulouse-Lautrec – At the Circus Fernando, Equestrienne
 Henry Scott Tuke – The Bathers
 Giovanni Turini – Statue of Giuseppe Garibaldi (bronze, Washington Square Park, New York City)
 John Henry Twachtman – Landscape, Branchville
 J. W. Waterhouse – The Lady of Shalott

 Vincent van Gogh
 Boats at Saintes-Maries-De-La-Mer (June)
 Harvest (at La Crau, with Montmajour in the Background) (June)
 Corn Harvest in Provence
 Farmhouse in Provence
 La Mousmé
 Sunset at Montmajour (August)
 Cafe Terrace at Night (Kröller-Müller Museum, Otterlo) (September)
 The Night Café (September)
 The Yellow House (September)
 Bedroom in Arles (first version; October)
 The Red Vineyard (November)
 The Sower (Sower with the Setting Sun) (June)
 Tarascon Diligence (October 12)
 Vincent's Chair and Gauguin's Armchair (November)

Births
 January 1 – Augustus Dunbier, American painter (died 1977).
 January 17 – Mohamed Nagy, Egyptian painter (died 1956).
 February 22 – Horace Pippin, self-taught African-American painter (died 1946).
 March 12 - Eric Kennington, English sculptor and painter (died 1960).
 March 14 – Marc-Aurèle Fortin, Canadian painter (died 1970).
 March 19 – Josef Albers, German artist, mathematician and educator (died 1976).
 April 6 – Hans Richter, German painter, graphic artist, avant-gardist, film-experimenter and producer (died 1976).
 June – David Dougal Williams, English painter (died 1944).
 June 12 – Tom Purvis, English poster artist (died 1959).
 July 10 – Giorgio de Chirico, Greek-Italian painter (died 1978).
 August 13 – Gleb W. Derujinsky, Russian-American sculptor (died 1975).
 August 14 – Sydney Carline, English painter, war artist (died 1929).
 August 30 – Siri Derkert, Swedish artist, sculptor and political campaigner (died 1973).
 September 4 – Oskar Schlemmer, German sculptor, painter, designer and choreographer (died 1943).
 November 7 – Mariano Andreu, Spanish painter, enamelling master, sculptor and stage designer (died 1976).
 November 11 – Johannes Itten, Swiss colour theorist, painter and designer (died 1967).
 Stanley Royle, English post-impressionist landscape painter (died 1961).

Deaths
 January 13 – John William Inchbold, pre-Raphaelite painter (born 1830)
 January 29 – Edward Lear, painter, illustrator and humorous writer (born 1812)
 February 5 – Anton Mauve, painter (born 1838)
 March 15 – Léonard Morel-Ladeuil, goldsmith and sculptor (born 1820)
 May 30 – Louis Buvelot, Swiss-Australian painter (born 1814)
 June 18 – Luigi Mussini, painter (born 1813)
 July 31 – Frank Holl, painter (born 1845)
 August 23 – Philip Henry Gosse, naturalist and illustrator (born 1810)
 August 30 – George O'Brien, engineer and painter (born 1821)
 September 28 – Thomas Gambier Parry, artist and art collector (born 1816)
 October – Frank O'Meara, Irish painter (born 1853)
 November 20 – Nathaniel Currier, illustrator (born 1813)
 date unknown
 Alexander Joseph Daiwaille, Dutch portrait painter (born 1818)
 Nam Gye-u, Korean painter and government official (born 1811)

Awards

References

 
Years of the 19th century in art
1880s in art